Courtney A. Taylor (born July 20, 1967), known as Courtney Taylor-Taylor, is an American singer-songwriter from Portland, Oregon. He is the lead singer and guitarist of alternative rock band The Dandy Warhols, a band he co-founded. Taylor-Taylor has written the majority of the band's songs.

Taylor-Taylor has co-written a graphic novel entitled One Model Nation, about a fictional 1970s German krautrock band. It was released in 2009. This was accompanied by a studio album titled Totalwerks, Vol. 1 (1969–1977), a fake greatest hits album by the fictional band, released in 2012.

Early life and education 
Taylor-Taylor attended Sunset High School in Beaverton, a suburb of Portland, and studied sociology, psychology and music at Cascade College, also in Portland. He recalls sticking out as a teenager: "You don't fit in if you're a make-up-wearing weirdo, surrounded by large, clumsy guys and cheerleaders." He found refuge in the work of Friedrich Nietzsche and Kurt Vonnegut. It was there that he met future bandmate Peter Holmström.

After graduating, Taylor-Taylor worked as a mechanic while playing drums for local band Nero's Rome. He was also the drummer in the Portland-based glam rock/pop band The Beauty Stab.

Career

Music career 

Taylor-Taylor appears in and narrates the film Dig!, a documentary chronicling the early years of the relationship between his band, The Dandy Warhols, and The Brian Jonestown Massacre.

Non-music career 

Taylor-Taylor appeared in an episode of the second season of the TV show Veronica Mars, "Cheatty Cheatty Bang Bang", performing the song "Love Hurts". He appeared in the 2009 music documentary film The Heart Is a Drum Machine, as well as a 2011 episode of the Australian music quiz television show Spicks and Specks.

Taylor-Taylor was one of the contributors to the book Sex Tips from Rock Stars by Paul Miles, published by Omnibus Press in July 2010.

Personal life 

Like his cousin and bandmate Brent DeBoer, Taylor-Taylor is of Dutch ancestry.

As the chief songwriter for "Bohemian Like You", Taylor-Taylor earned approximately 1.5 million US dollars in royalties for Vodafone's use of the song in television commercials in the telecommunications company's native United Kingdom (and other territories Vodafone operate in, including Australia and Greece) in late-2001. With part of these earnings, he purchased a quarter-of-a-city block and turned it into a complex with space for recording, film editing, and web design.

On December 22, 2007, Taylor-Taylor married long-time girlfriend Lockett Allbritton at the Columbia Gorge Hotel in Hood River, Oregon. Lockett Taylor is a yoga practitioner and instructor. On February 1, 2010, she gave birth to their first child, a son.

Taylor-Taylor has expressed a dislike of politics. Following then-UK Home Secretary Theresa May using the song "Bohemian Like You" as she walked away from a conference stage, Taylor-Taylor wrote "I tend to really dislike ANY people who take sides in politics. It is the single greatest contributor to getting nothing done. Fuck “politics”. What a joke."

References

External links 
 
 
 One Model Nation website

1967 births
American rock guitarists
American male guitarists
American rock songwriters
American rock singers
Musicians from Portland, Oregon
Living people
American people of Dutch descent
People from Beaverton, Oregon
American alternative rock musicians
The Dandy Warhols members
Alternative rock guitarists
Sunset High School (Beaverton, Oregon) alumni
Singer-songwriters from Oregon
Guitarists from Oregon
20th-century American guitarists
20th-century American male musicians
American male singer-songwriters